Longilinea is a bacteria genus from the family of Anaerolineaceae with one known species (Longilinea arvoryzaes).  .

References

Chloroflexota
Bacteria genera
Monotypic bacteria genera